Hampden may refer to:

Places

Oceania
 Hampden, New Zealand
 Hampden (New Zealand electorate)
 Murchison, New Zealand, known as Hampden until 1882
 Hampden, Queensland
 Hampden, South Australia
 County of Hampden, Victoria, Australia
 Shire of Hampden, a former local government area in Melbourne, Victoria, Australia

Canada
 Hampden, Newfoundland and Labrador
 Hampden, Quebec

Great Britain
 Hampden Park, a football stadium in Glasgow, third local ground using the name
Hampden Park (1873–83), its first predecessor
Second Hampden Park (known as such 1883–1903)
 Hampden Park, Eastbourne, a suburb of Eastbourne, Sussex
 Great and Little Hampden, a parish in Buckinghamshire

United States
 Hampden, Alabama
 Hampden, Maine, a town in Penobscot County
 Hampden (CDP), Maine, census-designated place within the town
 Hampden Academy, former theological seminary, now a public high school
 Hampden, Baltimore, Maryland, a neighborhood
 Hampden County, Massachusetts
 Hampden, Massachusetts, a town in Hampden County
 Hampden, North Dakota
 Hampden, Ohio
 Hampden, West Virginia
 Hampden, Wisconsin
 Hampden Township (disambiguation)
 The fictitious town of Hampden, Vermont, in Donna Tartt's novel The Secret History

People
 John Hampden (circa 1595–1643), English politician and Roundhead in the English Civil War
 John Hampden (1653–1696) (1653–1696), English politician, pamphleteer, and opponent of Charles II and James II, convicted of treason after the Monmouth Rebellion
 Renn Hampden (1793–1868), English theologian, Professor at Oxford, Bishop of Hereford (1847–68)
 Richard Hampden (1631–1695), English Whig politician, Privy Counsellor, and Chancellor of the Exchequer for William III of England
 Walter Hampden (1879–1955), American actor
 Viscount Hampden
 1st Viscount Hampden (disambiguation)

Other
 Hampden & Co., a British independent private bank
 Hampden Bank, a registered national historic building in Springfield, Massachusetts
 Handley Page Hampden, a British medium bomber aircraft of World War 2
 Hampden Park (disambiguation)
 Hampden–Sydney College, an all-male liberal arts college in Hampden–Sydney, Virginia
 USS Hampden
 USS Hampden County (LST-803)

See also
 The Hampdens, an Australian indie pop band